Rzhavsky is a rural locality (a khutor) in Dobrinskoye Rural Settlement, Uryupinsky District, Volgograd Oblast, Russia. The population was 158 as of 2010. There are 4 streets.

Geography 
Rzhavsky is located 21 km southwest of Uryupinsk (the district's administrative centre) by road. Besplemyanovsky is the nearest rural locality.

References 

Rural localities in Uryupinsky District